"Dile a Ella" ("Tell Her") is a song written by Gil Francisco and performed by Puerto Rican salsa singer Víctor Manuelle on his fourth studio album A Pesar de Todo (1997). It was released as the lead single from the album. In the song, the singer asks his friend to tell a woman that he loved that he cannot forget her. It became his third #1 hit on the Tropical Airplay chart and spent nine weeks week on top, making it the longest-running tropical song of 1997. José A. Estévez, Jr. called it a tune that "bristles with uninhibited energy". Paul Verna of Billboard cited the song as one of the album's "amorous ditties". "Dile a Ella" was also listed on Billboards "Best 15 Salsa Songs Ever". "Dile a Ella" won a BMI Latin Award in 1999.

Charts

Weekly charts

Year-end charts

See also
List of Billboard Tropical Airplay number ones of 1997

References

1997 songs
1997 singles
Víctor Manuelle songs
Sony Discos singles
Spanish-language songs